Goopy Bagha Phirey Elo is a 1992 Indian Bengali comedy film directed by Sandip Ray and written by Satyajit Ray. A sequel to the 1980 film Heerak Rajar Deshe and the third installment of Goopy Gyne Bagha Byne series, the film was released twelve years after its predecessor. Till date, it was the third and last installment of the Goopy - Bagha series.

Plot
Goopy Gyne and Bagha Byne rule the kingdom of Shundi and get bored of enjoying the royal luxuries. They want to get back to the days of adventure they had enjoyed all their lives, but age comes in the way. They leave the kingdom in search of new experiences. Finally, they reach Anandapur and win the king's heart with their musical abilities and powers. In the courtroom, they meet Brahmananda Acharya, who invites Goopy and Bagha to come to Anandagarh fort. When they go to his place, he offers them a job to steal three valuable stones, making use of their miraculous powers gifted by Bhuter Raja (King of Ghosts). In return, he promises to make them 20 years younger, but actually, he tells a lie. He cannot make anyone younger. They steal two rare stones with the hope to become young again.

However, in their dream, the King of Ghost appears and advises them to keep off injustice. They apologize to him and return the stones to the respective owners. Brahmananda Acharya had gained immense powers, which is proved when he is not rendered motionless by Goopy's song. But, due to his greed for gaining rare and valuable stones, he is denied immortality. It was foretold that a 12-year boy named Bikram, with divine powers, would defeat him. To prevent his death, Brahmananda Acharya has all the 12-year-old boys in Anandapur, named Bikram, kidnapped by his soldiers. He hypnotized them, making them his servants. In the end, Goopy and Bagha find out that one boy named Kanu was previously named Bikram. At the time of the meeting, Goopy sings a song and Kanu is not hypnotized by it. Kanu receives divine powers at the age of 12. He, along with Goopy, Bagha, and Pradip Pandit, goes towards Anandagarh fort. There, as Bikram enters the fort and comes close to Brahmananda Acharya, the Acharya sinks beneath the ground, signifying that he has been destroyed. His valuable stones also vanish.

Cast
 Tapen Chatterjee as Goopy Gyne
 Rabi Ghosh as Bagha Byne
 Ajit Bandyopadhyay as Brahmananda Acharya
 Kamu Mukherjee as a king
 Haradhan Bandopadhyay as the king of Anandapur
 Pramod Ganguly as Kanu's grandfather
 Bhishma Guhathakurta as Pradip Pandit
 Purab Chatterjee as Kanu/Bikram

Awards

BFJA Awards (1993)
 Best Indian Films
 Best Art Direction - Ashok Bose
 Best Cinematography - Barun Raha
 Best Editing - Dulal Dutta
 Best Lyrics - Satyajit Ray
 Best Music - Satyajit Ray
 Best Playback Singer (Male) - Anup Ghoshal
 Most Outstanding Work Of The Year - Tapen Chatterjee

Sequel
Sandip Ray wanted to make another sequel to this series. He had received many requests to make the fourth Goopy - Bagha movie. Ray said to The Times of India about the plot of the fourth film: "Making a Goopy Bagha movie without Tapen and Rabi is unthinkable. The only way I can do a fourth is by taking the story forward and introducing Goopy and Bagha's sons". The idea to weave a story around the next generation came from a line from the introductory song 'Mora dujonai rajar jamai in 'Hirak Rajar Deshe' — "aar ache polapan, ek khan ek khan... (we have one child each)".

References

External links
 
 BBC-h2g2 Entry: Satyajit Ray's Goopy-Bagha Trilogy

Bengali-language Indian films
Films directed by Sandip Ray
1990s Indian superhero films
Indian children's films
Films with screenplays by Satyajit Ray
Films set in Asia
1990s Bengali-language films
Indian superhero films